Tai Mun Shan (Chinese: 大蚊山; Cantonese Yale: daaih mān shāan) lies to the west of Tai Long Wan near Chek King on the Sai Kung Peninsula in Hong Kong. The hill comprises a rounded peak, which rises to a height 370 metres (1,210 feet).

The name translates as the Big Hill of the Mosquitoes.

See also
List of mountains, peaks and hills in Hong Kong
Sai Wan
Sai Kung Country Park

Mountains, peaks and hills of Hong Kong
Sai Kung Peninsula